Prathapachandran (1941–2004) was an Indian actor, who worked predominantly in  Malayalam film industry, though he acted in a few Tamil and Telugu movies as well. He known for the portrayal of villainous and character roles in over 300 movies. He was born in 1941 at Omallur in Thiruvithamkoor princely state, currently within the Pathanamthitta District, Kerala.

Biography
Prathapachandran had to end his formal schooling by the 9th standard. He later moved to Kollam, and at the age of 14, he moved to Madras, hoping to be a movie actor. During his initial years, though he failed to garner any significant movie roles, he lent voice in radio plays and acted in plays organized by the Madras Malayali association. He got his first movie role in Viyarppinte Vila (1962), in which he acted as a man in his 70s. As he couldn't sustain the success, he returned to Kollam, and switched fulltime to theatre, working with Kalidasa Kalakendram. He could return to movies only in 1977, bagging a role in Jagadguru Aadisankaran. That kicked off a fresh career, and he went on to act in over 400 movies. His characters in films like Oru CBI Diary Kurippu, Manu Uncle, Kottayam Kunjachan, August 1 etc. were widely appreciated. Prathapachandran also produced a few Malayalam movies, including Manavadharmam, Prakadanam, Kodathi, Ivide Ingane, Kattuthee, etc.

Family
Prathapachandran died on December 16, 2004 and was survived by his wife Chandrika and three children Anoop, Deepak and Prathibha. He died after a massive cardiac arrest at his home.

Filmography

As an Actor

Malayalam

 2004 - Thirichu Varavu
 2003 - Janakeeyam as Prathapan
 2003 - Veendum Thulabharam 
 2002 - Dian
 2002 - Sisiram
 2002 - Nee Enikkai Mathrem as Raghavan
 2002 - Asurayugam
 2002 - Niramulla Swapnagal
 2002 - Vanibham
 2001 - Aalilathoni
 2001 - Aa Oru Nimisham
 2001 - Agnipushpam
 2001 - Swathithampuratti
 2001 - Chaarasundari
 2001 - Premagni
 2001 - Maami
 2001 - Layathaalangal
 2001 - Malaramban
 2001 - Sagara
 2001 - Romance
 2001 - Yamini as Ouseppachan 
 2000 - Indriyam
 2000 - Summer Palace
 2000 - Nisheedhini
 1999 - Inalakal Ilathe as Biju Menon's Father
 1997 - Maasmaram
 1997 - Oru Mutham Mani Mutham
 1996 - Aayiram Naavulla Ananthan as  Sridevi's Father 
 1996 - April 19
 1995 - Mannar Mathai Speaking
 1994 - Chief Minister KR Gouthami
 1994 - Gandeevam
 1994 - Kambolam as Subramaniya Iyyer
 1994 - Rajadhani as Chief Minister
 1995 - Vrudhanmare Sookshikkuka as  Police Officer 
 1995 - Sindoora Rekha as Doctor 
 1995 - Mannar Mathai Speaking as Doctor 
 1993 - Customs Diary as  Customs Officer 
 1993 - Sthreedhanam
 1993 - Mafia as Commissioner Warrier
 1993 - Uppukandom Brothers
 1993 - Jackpot as [Ruby Devaraj]
 1993 - Acharyan
 1993 - Paalayam as Krishnakumar 
 1992 - Kizhakkan Pathrose
 1992 - Mahanagaram as C.R.K. 
 1992 - Nadodi
 1992 - Mayangunna Manasukal
 1992 - Priyappetta Kukku
 1992 - Rishi
 1992 - Mahaan
 1992 - Soorya Chakram
 1992 - Ente Tuition Teacher
 1992 - Avalariyathe
 1992 - Maanyanmaar
 1992 - Malootty
 1991 - Thudarkadha as Thomas Mathew
 1991 - Raid as Jayan Panikkar
 1991 - Koodikazhca as Thachampalli Divakara Panikkar 
 1991 - Kadalora Kattu as Mamman George
 1991 - Ente Sooryaputhrikku as Shiva Prasad
 1991 - Nattuvishesham as Mathew
 1991 - Oru Prathyeka Ariyippu as Minister
 1991 - Mimics Parade as Cheriyan
 1991 - Oru Tharam Randu Tharam Moonu Tharam as S Nambiar
 1991 - Aakasha Kottayile Sultan as  Vishwanathan Nair  
 1990 - Samrajyam
 1990 - Indrajaalam as Baburaj 
 1990 - Ee Thanutha Veluppan Kalathu as C. K. Gopala Menon 
 1990 - Varthamana kaalam
 1990 - Kottayam Kunjachan as Kanjirappalli Pappachan 
 1990 - Arhatha
 1990 - Malootty
 1990 - Aval Ariyathe as Prabhakara Varma
 1990 - Nammude Naadu as Prabhakara Panikkar
 1990 - Niyamam Entu Cheyyum
 1990 - Sthreekku Vendi Sthree
 1990 - Oliyampukal as Kariyachan 
 1989 - Naaduvazhikal as Panickar 
 1989 - Mahayanam as Kochu Varkey 
 1989 - News  as Viswanathan 
 1989 - Jagratha as Narayanan
 1989 - Douthyam as Colonel 
 1989 - Bhadrachitta
 1989 - Ancharakkulla Vandi as Sadananthan
 1989 - Ivalente Kamuki
 1989 - My Dear Rosy
 1989 - Adhipan
 1989 - Mahaayanam
 1989 - New Year
 1989 - Adikkurippu as Venkata Swamy 
 1988 - Oru CBI Diary Kurippu as  Narayanan
 1988 - August 1 as Kazhuthumuttam Vasudevan Pillai
 1988 - Anuraagi
 1988 - Thaala
 1988 - Vida Parayan Mathrem
 1988 - Oohakkachavadam
 1988 - Sankham
 1988 - Evidence
 1988 - Bheekaran
 1988 - Manu uncle as Ravunni 
 1988 - Vicharana  as Govindan Nair 
 1988 - Aranyakam as Nambiar 
 1988 - Moonnam Mura  as Bharathan Menon 
 1988 - Pattana Pravesham as Ashok Varma 
 1988 - Abkari as Kaimal 
 1988 - Dhinarathrangal as Doctor
 1988 - Mrithyunjayam as Priest
 1987 - Nee Allenkil Njan
 1987 - Kaalathinte Shabdam as Krishna Menon
 1987 - Aids 
 1987 - Vazhiyorakkazhchakal as Police Officer 
 1987 - Cheppu as Matthews 
 1987 - New Delhi as Jailor 
 1987 - Thaniyavarthanam
 1987 - Oru Sindoora Pottinte Ormaykku as Fr. Xavier 
 1987 - January Oru Orma  as Fr. Fernandez 
 1987 - Bhoomiyile Rajakkanmar as  Rajashekharan 
 1987 - Irupatham Noottandu
 1987 - Neeyallengil Njan as Shekhar
 1987 - Vrutham as Nancy's Father 
 1987 - Ithrayum Kalam as Nampoothiri 
 1986 - Panchagni as Avarachan 
 1986 - Snehamulla Simham as C. R.
 1986 - Vikram 
 1986 - Aavanazhi  
 1986 - Naale Njagalude Vivaham
 1986 - Niramulla Raavukal
 1986 - Rajaavinte Makan
 1986 - Yuvajanotsavam as Sakhavu P.K
 1985 - Snehicha Kuttathinu
 1985 - Jeevante Jeevan as Nanu
 1985 - Kiraatham as Prathapan
 1985 - Ente Kanakkuyyil
 1985 - Choodatha Pookkal
 1985 - Puzhayozhugum Vazhi
 1985 - Chorakku Chora as Rahman 
 1985 - Ee Thalamura Ingane
 1985 - Muhurtham Pathnonnu Muppathinu as The Priest 
 1985 - Makan Ente Makan as Judge 
 1985 - Oru Kudakeezhil as Vijayalakshmi's father
 1985 - Nirakkoottu as Paul Mathew 
 1985 - Koodum Thedi as Mathaikutty 
 1985 - Azhiyatha Bandhangal as Achuthan Nair 
 1985 - Vannu Kandu Keezhadakki
 1985 - Vellarikka Pattanam as Kuriakose 
 1985 - Udaya Geetham 
 1985 - Akkacheyude Kunjuvava 
 1985 - Kandu Kandarinju as Sreedharan's Father 
 1984 - Ivide Ingane as Mathew 
 1984 - Uyarangalil as The Priest 
 1984 - Muththodu Muthu as Sreenivasan 
 1984 - Sandharbham
 1984 - Minimol Vathikkanil as Mathew
 1984 - Umanilayam as Jagannatha Varma
 1984 - Kodathi as Police Officer
 1984 - Kadamattathachan as Valiachan
 1984 - NH 47
 1984 - Chakkarayumma as Doctor
 1984 - Sandhya Mayangum Neram as  Varma 
 1984 - Mangalam Nerunnu 
 1984 - Unaroo 
 1984 - Kurishuyudham as Doctor
 1984 - Piriyilla Naam as Prabhakaran Pillai 
 1984 - Koottinilamkili as Menon
 1984 - Onnum Mindatha Bharya 
 1983 - Ente Kadha
 1983 - Paalam
 1983 - Bandham
 1983 - Nadi Muthal Nadi Vare
 1983 - Kolakomban
 1983 - Ankam as Dr. Rahman
 1983 - Swapnalokam
 1983 - Himam as Madhavan
 1983 - Manassoru Mahaasamudram
 1983 - Aa Rathri as Advocate 
 1983 - Thaalam thettiya tharattu as Judge 
 1983 - Aattakkalasham as Indu's Father 
 1983 - Prathigna as Moosakka 
 1983 - Oru Odai Nathiyaakirathu 
 1983 - Maniyara as Singer at Ajmer 
 1983 - Iniyenkilum as Swamy 
 1983 - Himavahini as Hema's Father 
 1983 - Changatham as Balachandran 
 1983 - Bhookambam 
 1983 - Sandhyakku Virinja Poovu as Nambyar 
 1982 - Jambulingam
 1982 - Postmortem as Esthappan 
 1982 - Iththiri neram Oththiri kaaryam as Geejo's Father 
 1982 - Aakrosam as Menon 
 1982 - Innalenkil Nale 
 1982 - Ee Nadu as Minister Govindan
 1982 - Sharavarsham
 1982 - Thuranna Jail as Habeeb
 1982 - Sree Ayappanum Vavarum
 1982 - John Jaffer Janardhanan
 1982 - Aarambham as Police officer
 1982 - Ponnum Poovum
 1982 - Anuraagakkodathi as Minister Chandrsekharan
 1982 - Chilanthivala as Doctor Peter
 1982 - Pooviriyum Pulari as Rajaram
 1981 - Munnettam
 1981 - Kattukallan as Eshwara Pilla
 1981 - Ahimsa as Govindan 
 1981 - Attimari as Prabhakaran
 1981 - Abhinayam
 1981 - Pathirasooryan as Mathai
 1980 - Shakthi
 1980 - Makaravilakku
 1980 - Pappu
 1980 - Rajaneegandhi as Vasu Menon
 1980 - Prakadanam as Kattukallan
 1980 - Benz Vasu
 1980 - Theenalangal as Father Mathew
 1980 - Manjil Virinja Pookkal as Sivasankara Panikkar 
 1980 - Angaadi as Settu 
 1980 - Manushya Mrugam
 1980 - Chandrahasam as Nanu 
 1980 - Love In Singapore as Krishnan Nair 
 1980 - Moorkhan as Forrest Officer 
 1980 - Ithikkara Pakky as Priest
 1979 - Krishnapparunthu
 1979 - Ottappettavar
 1979 - Maanavadharmam
 1979 - Raathrikal Ninakku Vendi
 1979 - Pambaram
 1979 - Kallu Karthyani
 1979 - Arattu
 1979 - Sarppam 
 1979 - Avano Atho Avalo as Narayanan
 1979 - Angakkuri 
 1978 - Vayanaadan Thampan
 1978 - Kaithappoo
 1978 - Ahalya
 1978 - Adavukal Pathinettu
 1978 - Paavaadakkari
 1978 - Sathrathil Oru Raathri
 1978 - Avalkku Maranammilla
 1978 - Thamburatti as Rema's father
 1978 - Kanalkattakal as Kattumooppan
 1978 - Jayikkanayi Janichavan   
 1978 - Sakthi as Prathap 
 1978 - Madalasa
 1978 - Randil Onnu as Advocate
 1978 - Lisa as Madhava Menon
 1978 - Madanolsavam as Dr. Radhakrishnan
 1977 - Ammayi Amma
 1977 - Mohavum Mukthiyum
 1977 - Dweepu
 1977 - Samudram
 1977 - Angeekaram as Shekharan Pilla
 1977 - Minimol
 1977 - Aparadhi as Jayachandran's Father
 1977 - Nurayum Pathayum
 1977 - Jagadguru Aadishankaran as Vishnusharman/Sanandan
 1977 - Anugraham as Principal
 1977 - Oonjal as Chathan
 1976 - Dweep
 1976 - Ayakkari as Sathi's Father
 1976 - Themmadi Velappan
 1976 - Kamadhenu
 1976 - Aayiram Janmagal
 1976 - Aalinganam as Menon
 1976 - Amritavahini as Doctor
 1975 - Thomasleeha
 1975 - Sooryavamsham
 1975 - Ulsavam as Contractor Cheriyan
 1975 - Babumon
 1975 - Hello Darling as Police Officer
 1975 - Chumaduthaangi
 1975 - Ayodhya as Ramdas
 1968 - Dial 22 44
 1968 - Padunna Puzha as Advocate
 1968 - Vidhyarthi
 1967 - Maadatharuvi
 1967 - Cochin Express as Police constable
 1966 - Kayamkulam Kochunni as Kallada Kochu Naanu
 1966 - Sthanarthi Saramma
 1966 - Archana as Rajan's collegemate
 1966 - Kamadhenu as Shivaraman
 1966 - Tharavattamma as Suresh's Friend
 1966 - Sthanarthi Saramma as Kuriachan
 1965 - Kavyamela as Prasadakan
 1965 - Daaham.... Gopalan 
 1965 - Chettathi as Gopi's Friend
 1965 - Jeevitha Yaathra as Registrar
 1964 - Bharthaavu
 1964 - Sree Guruvayoorappan
 1964 - Kudumbini as Man at Carnival
 1964 - School Master as Gopala Pilla
 1964 - Oraal Koodi Kallanayi
 1962 - Viyarppinte Vila

Tamil
 1980 - Varumayin Niram Sigappu (1980)
 1983 - Thudikkum Karangal (1983)
 1983 - Oru Odai Nadhiyagirathu (1983)
 1983 - Kai Varisai
 1985 - Udhaya Geetham
 1986 - Vikram (1986)
 1986 - Kulirkaala Megangal
 1987 - Nayakan
 1987 - Arul Tharum Ayyappan
 1989 - Mounam Sammadham
 1990 - Nadigan
 1991 - Karpoora Mullai
 1991 - Nanbargal
 1991 - Thanga Thamaraigal
 1991 - Pudhiya Raagam
 1992 - Mannan
 1992 - Pandiyan
 1993 - Walter Vetrivel
 1993 - Madurai Meenakshi
 1993 - Uzhaippali
 1997 - Rettai Jadai Vayasu
 1997 - Kadhal Palli
 1998 - Kumbakonam Gopalu
 1999 - Malabar Police
 1999 - Suryodayam
 1999 - Jayam

Telugu
Patalam Pandu 1981
Peddinti Alludu 1991

Produced films
 Manavadharmam (1979)
 Prakadanam (1980)
 Ivide Ingane (1984)
 Kodathi (1984)
 Kaattuthee (1985)

Story
 Kodathy (1984)
 Ee Thalamura Ingana (1985)

Dubbing Artist
Chandrabimbam-Voice for M. N. Nambiar
Devasuram-Voice for Delhi Ganesh

Television
Deepam (Doordarshan) (direction, production)
Kadamattathu Kathanar (Asianet)
Vizhuthugal

References

External links
 
 Profile of Malayalam Actor Prathapachandran
 Prathapa Chandran - Filmography, Movies, Photos, Biography, Wallpapers, Videos, Fan Club, Popcorn.oneindia.in
 Prathapachandran's movies in Malayalam movies

Male actors from Pathanamthitta
People from Omallur
1941 births
Date of birth missing
2004 deaths
20th-century Indian dramatists and playwrights
20th-century Indian male actors
20th-century Indian male writers
20th-century Indian screenwriters
21st-century Indian male actors
Film producers from Kerala
Indian male film actors
Indian male screenwriters
Indian male television actors
Malayalam film producers
Male actors in Malayalam cinema
Male actors in Malayalam television
Male actors in Tamil cinema
Screenwriters from Kerala